The Battle of Tashiskari was fought between the Georgians and the Ottoman Turks at the village of Tashiskari on June 16, 1609. The Georgians, led by Giorgi Saakadze won a victory over the Ottoman Turks.

Notes

References

Sources

Tashiskari
Tashiskari
Tashiskari
1609 in the Ottoman Empire
17th century in Georgia (country)